Izzo is an Italian surname. Notable people with the surname include:

Angelo Izzo, Italian pharmacologist
Armando Izzo (born 1992), Italian footballer
Jean-Claude Izzo (1945–2000), French poet, playwright, screenwriter, and novelist
John Izzo, American and Canadian businessman, corporate advisor, speaker, bestselling author and an advocate for sustainable living
Larry Izzo (born 1974), American football player
Lorenza Izzo (born 1989), Chilean film actress and model
Paul Izzo (born 1995), Australian professional football player
Renato Izzo (1929-2009), Italian actor, voice actor and screenwriter
Ryan Izzo (born 1995), American football player
Simona Izzo (born 1953), Italian actress, voice actress, director and screenwriter
Tom Izzo (born 1955),  American college basketball coach